A theophoric name (from Greek: , theophoros, literally "bearing or carrying a god") embeds the word equivalent of 'god' or God's name in a person's name, reflecting something about the character of the person so named in relation to that deity. For example, names embedding Apollo, such as Apollonios or Apollodorus, existed in Greek antiquity.

Theophoric personal names, containing the name of a god in whose care the individual is entrusted (or a generic word for god), were also exceedingly common in the ancient Near East and Mesopotamia.  Some names of theophoric origin remain common today, such as Theodore (theo-, "god"; -dore, origin of word compound in Greek: doron, "gift"; hence "God's gift"; in Greek: Theodoros) or less recognisably as Jonathan (from Hebrew Yonatan/Yehonatan, meaning "Yahweh has given").

Classical Greek and Roman theophoric names

 Demetrius and its derivatives mean "follower of Demeter."
 Dennis, in Latin Dionysius, and its relatives mean "of Dionysus." Compounds such as Dionysodorus/Dionysodora ("gift of Dionysos"),  Dionysodotus/Dionysodota ("given by Dionysos"), and Dionysikles ("glory of Dionysos") also exist.
 Marcus, Martin and relatives mean "of Mars."
 Zeno and Diodoros or Diodorus from Zeus (genitive of Zeus is 'dios')
Poseidonios, Poseidippos, and Poseidorus from Poseidon
Athenodoros/Athenodora from Athena
Minervina from Minerva
Apollodoros/Apollodora and Apollonios from Apollo
Artemisia and Artemidoros/Artemidora from Artemis
Aphrodesia from Aphrodite; Hephaistion from Hephaistos
Aria from Ares
Hermione and Hermippos from Hermes
Herodotus/Herodota and Herakles from Hera
Heliodoros/a from Helios
Fortunatus from Fortuna
Serapion from Serapis
Isidoros or Isidora from Isis.
Certain names of classical gods are sometimes given as personal names. The most common is Diana and its variants, such as Diane; others include Minerva, Aphrodite, Venus, Isis, or Juno. The first pope to take a regnal name, Pope John II, had the given name Mercurius and changed his name as he considered it inappropriate for the Pope to have the name of a pagan deity.

Christian theophoric names

 Amadeus: (Latin) "lover of God"
 Bogdan: (Slavic) "God given"
 Bogomil: (Slavic) "dear to God"
 Bozhidar: (Slavic) "gift of God"
 Christian: (Greek) "believer in Christ"
 Christopher: (Greek) "Christ-bearer".
 Daniel: (Hebrew) "God is my Judge"
 Deodatus/Deusdedit: (Latin) "God-given"
 Dorotheus/Dorothea: (Greek) "gift to God"
 Fürchtgott: (Germanic) "God-fearing"
 Geoffrey/Gottfried: (Germanic) "God's peace"
 Gottlieb: (Germanic) "God's love"
 Michael: (Hebrew) "who is like God"
 Philothea/Philothei/Philotheos: (Greek) "lover of God"
 Shenouda: (Coptic) "son of God"
 Raphael: (Hebrew) "He has healed"
 Theodore/Theodora: (Greek) "gift of God"
 Theodosius/Theodosia, Theodotos/Theodotē and Dositheus/Dosithea: (Greek) "God-given"
 Theodotus: (Greek): "given by God"
 Theophilus: (Greek) "one who loves God"
 Theognis: (Greek) "God-knowing"
 Theophanes/Theophania, Tiffany: (Greek) "manifestation of God"
 Theophrastus: (Greek) "godly speech"
 Theaetetus: (Greek) "one who pleads to God"
 Timothy/Timotheus: (Greek) "one who honors God"

Some Christian saints have polytheistic theophoric names (such as Saint Dionysius, Saint Mercurius, Saint Saturninus, Saint Hermes, Saint Martin of Tours, Saint Demetrius of Thessaloniki).

Germanic theophoric names

 Os, meaning "god"
 Oslac
 Oswald
 Oswin
 Thor, the god of thunder
 Thorstein means "Thor's stone"
 Thorkel means "Thor's craft"
 Thorulf means "Thor's wolf"
 Thordis
 Thora
 Ing, an old name for Freyr (an epithet meaning "lord")
 Ingrid
 Ingeborg
 Inger
 Ingunn

Rarely, Germanic names contain the element Wod (such as Woðu-riðe), potentially pointing to an association with the god Odin. In connection, numerous names containing wulf "wolf" have been taken as totemistic, expressing association with Odin in the earliest period, although -ulf degenerated into a mere suffix from an early time (Förstemann 1856).

Hinduism

The personal names of almost all gods and goddesses of various deities from the polytheistic Hindu pantheon are considered common and traditional names for people from region. Many traditional Hindu names are in fact from various names or epithets of Hindu gods or goddesses. This is in addition to compound theophoric names using the name of a deity in addition to possessive qualifiers.

 Names of gods which are also used as personal names, include
 Vishnu
 Shiva
 Lakshmi
 Parvati
 Indra
 Personal names using a deity's name as the base
 Vaishnavi, meaning "a worshipper of Vishnu"
 Shivansh, meaning "a part of Shiva"

Brahma, the Hindu creator god, is one of the only deities of the pantheon whose name is rarely if ever used as a personal name or as a base for theophoric personal names. 

Some seemingly theophoric names, may in fact be more related to the original etymology of the deity's name itself. For example, both Lakshmi and Lakshman are names of a deity and an avatar respectively, which are both derived from the etymological root Laksh meaning goal or aim, which in itself is also a valid personal name.

Islam

 Abdullah: "servant of God"

Judaism and biblical

Much Hebrew theophory occurs in the Bible, particularly in the Old Testament. The most prominent theophory involves
 names referring to El, a word meaning might, power and (a) god in general, and hence in Judaism, God and among the Canaanites the name of the god who was the father of Baal.
 names referring to Yah, a shortened form of Yahweh.
 names referring to Levantine deities (especially the storm god, Hadad) by the epithet Baal, meaning lord.

In later times, as the conflict between Yahwism and the more popular pagan practices became increasingly intense, these names were censored and Baal was replaced with Bosheth, meaning shameful one. However the name Yahweh does not appear in theophoric names until the time of Joshua, and for the most part is very rare until the time of King Saul, when it began to be very popular.

El

 Ariel: "lion of God"
 Daniel: "God is my judge" or "justice from God"
 Elijah: "my God is YHWH"
 Elihu: "He is my God"
 Elisha: "my God is salvation"
 Elisheba (Elizabeth): "my God is an oath" or "my God is abundance" Immanuel: "God is with us"
 Ezekiel: "God will strengthen"
 Gabriel: "God is my strength"
 Ishmael: "God listens"
 Israel: "who struggles with God"
 Joel: "YHWH is God"
 Lemuel: "Dedicated/Devoted to God"
 Michael: "Who is like God"
 Nathaniel: "God-given" or "gift of God"
 Raphael: "God heals/God is great"
 Samuel: "God heard"
 Uriel: "God is my light"
 Uzziel: "God is my strength"

Yahweh

The name of the Israelite deity YHWH (usually shortened to Yah or Yahu, and Yeho or Yo) appears as a prefix or suffix in many theophoric names of the First Temple Period. For example, Yirme-yahu (Jeremiah), Yesha-yahu (Isaiah), Netan-yah, Yedid-yah, Adoni-yah, Nekhem-yah, Yeho-natan (Jonathan), Yeho-chanan (John), Yeho-shua (Joshua), Yeho-tzedek, Zekharya (Zechariah).

"Yahū" or "Yah" is the abbreviation of YHWH when used as a suffix in Hebrew names; as a prefix it appears as "Yehō-", or "Yo". It was formerly thought to be abbreviated from the Masoretic pronunciation "Yehovah". There is an opinion that, as Yahweh is likely an imperfective verb form, "Yahu" is its corresponding preterite or jussive short form: compare yiŝtahaweh (imperfective), yiŝtáhû (preterit or jussive short form) = "do obeisance".

 Abijah: "my father is YHWH"
 Hezekiah: "YHWH strengthens"
 Isaiah: "YHWH is salvation"
 Jedediah: "friend of YHWH"
 Jeremiah (Jeremy): "YHWH will raise"
 Jonathan: "YHWH has given"
 Joseph: "YHWH shall increase"
 Josiah: "YHWH saves"
 Matityahu (Matthew): "gift of YHWH"
 Micah/Micaiah: "who is like YHWH?"
 Nehemiah: "YHWH comforts"
 Obadiah: "servant of YHWH"
 Toviyahu (Tobias): "the goodness of YHWH"
 Uriah: "YHWH is my light"
 Uzziah: "YHWH is my strength"
 Yehoshua (Joshua)/Yeshua (Jesus): "YHWH will save"
 Yohanan (John): "graced by YHWH"
 Zechariah (Zachary): "YHWH has remembered"
 Zephaniah: "hidden by YHWH"

In the table below, 13 theophoric names with "Yeho" have corresponding forms where the letters eh have been omitted. There is a theory by Christian Ginsburg that this is due to Hebrew scribes omitting the "h", changing Jeho into Jo, to make the start of "Yeho-" names not sound like an attempt to pronounce the Divine Name.Scott Jones, Jehovah 

Referring to other gods
 Jerubbaal, the alternate name of Gideon, variously translated as "Baal will contend" 
 Jezebel: "glory to Baal"
 Ishbaal: "man of Baal"
 Balthazar and Belshazzar (Babylonian): "Baal, protect the king" 
 Abijam: "my father is Yam"
 Shalmaneser (Assyrian): "Shulmanu is foremost"
 Sennacherib (Assyrian): "Sîn has replaced the brothers"
 Pygmalion (Phoenician via Greek): "Pummay has given"
 Nebuchadnezzar (in Babylonian: Nabu-kudurri-usur): "Nabu, watch over my heir"
 Mordecai: "from Marduk"
 Ben-Hadad: in Hebrew means "son of Hadad", but his original Aramaic name is Hadadezer: "Hadad is help"
 Mark: "dedicated to Mars"

Theophoric names containing "Baal" were sometimes "censored" as -bosheth = "shameful one", whence Ishbosheth etc.

References

External links
 Gonzalo Rubio, Gods and Scholars: Mapping the Pantheon in Early Mesopotamia in Beate Pongratz-Leisten (ed.), Reconsidering the Concept of Revolutionary Monotheism'', Eisenbrauns 2011
 Lexicon of Greek Personal Names
 Ogden Goelet, "Moses' Egyptian Name"
 When Can Muslims Use the Name Mohammed?: Plus, why don't English speakers name their children Jesus? by Michelle Tsai

 
Given name types
Greek words and phrases
Names
Onomastics
Religious practices